Peter Barry may refer to:
Peter Barry (equestrian) (born 1956), Canadian Olympian
Peter Barry (footballer) (1937–2005), VFL footballer for Carlton
Peter Barry (hurler) (born 1974), Kilkenny inter-county hurler
Peter Barry (poet) (born 1947), British writer and academic
Peter Barry (politician) (1928–2016), Irish politician
Peter H. Barry, American geochemist

See also 
 Peter Berry (disambiguation)